,  was a Japanese biochemist, physiologist, and military physician. He discovered Oxygenases at the National Institute of Arthritis and Metabolic Diseases, National Institutes of Health in 1955.

Citing his "outstanding and pioneering contributions to biomedical sciences and enzymology," the Wolf Foundation awarded Hayaishi the 1986 Wolf Prize in Medicine "for his discovery of the oxygenase enzymes and elucidation of their structure and biological importance".

Hayaishi was President of International Union of Biochemistry and Molecular Biology from 1973 to 1976.

Biography 
Hayaishi was born in Stockton, California, United States, in 1920. He completed his medical degree in 1942 from Osaka University. After serving as a medical officer in the Japanese Navy for 3 years, he joined the Institute of Microbial Diseases, Osaka University and was awarded his Ph.D. in 1949.

After working with Arthur Kornberg at the National Institute of Arthritis and Metabolic Diseases, National Institutes of Health and Washington University in St. Louis, Hayaishi served as a research group leader or a professor at various research institutions in the US and Japan including Kyoto University, and led approximately 600 graduate students in his life including Yasutomi Nishizuka, Tasuku Honjo, and Shigetada Nakanishi. More than 100 his pupils became professors at various universities in Japan.

Research 
Hayaishi, along with group members, is recognized for his great contributions to biomedical sciences and enzymology, especially the discovery of Oxygenases group of enzymes. These enzymes are widely distributed in nature and represent a unique group of respiratory enzymes that catalyze the direct incorporation of molecular oxygen into various substrates.

Hayaishi is also known for his discovery of the sleep-inducing action of Prostaglandin D2.

Recognition 
Hayaishi was awarded several honors including, the Asahi Prize (1964), the Japan Academy Prize (1967), the Order of Culture (1972), the Louis and Bert Freedman Foundation Award from the New York Academy of Sciences (1976), the Wolf Prize in Medicine (1986), and the Distinguished Scientist Award of the World Federation of Sleep Research Societies (1999).

Hayaishi was also elected as a foreign member of several academies, as well as a member of the Japan Academy (MJA) in 1974.

In 1984, the honorary citizenship of Kyoto was awarded to Hayaishi.

References

External links 
 The Wolf Prize in Medicine in 1986 (detail)
 A Profile of Osamu Hayaishi
 Hayaishi's profile
 Hayaishi Research history

1920 births
2015 deaths
20th-century Japanese physicians
21st-century Japanese physicians
Foreign associates of the National Academy of Sciences
Foreign Fellows of the Indian National Science Academy
Japanese biochemists
Japanese military doctors
Japanese physiologists
Academic staff of Kyoto University
Members of the German Academy of Sciences Leopoldina
Members of the Japan Academy
Osaka University alumni
Academic staff of Osaka University
Recipients of the Order of Culture
Academic staff of the University of Tokyo
Wolf Prize in Medicine laureates
American emigrants to Japan
Presidents of the International Union of Biochemistry and Molecular Biology
Washington University School of Medicine faculty